In 2006 the Las Vegas Desert Classic, an American darts tournament, was won by the Canadian player John Part.

Qualifiers

Pro Qualified players

Qualifiers

Prize Fund

Results

References

Las Vegas Desert Classic
Las Vegas Desert Classic